is a former Japanese football player.

Playing career
Shimaoka was born in Nabari on July 26, 1973. After graduating from Kansai University, he joined Japan Football League club Tosu Futures (later Sagan Tosu) in 1996. He played many matches as midfielder from 1997 and the club was promoted to new league J2 League from 1999. He retired end of 2001 season.

Club statistics

References

External links

1973 births
Living people
Kansai University alumni
Association football people from Mie Prefecture
Japanese footballers
J2 League players
Japan Football League (1992–1998) players
Sagan Tosu players
Association football midfielders